Barbour Lewis (January 5, 1818 – July 15, 1893) was an American politician and a member of the United States House of Representatives for Tennessee's 9th congressional district.

Biography
Lewis was born in Alburgh, Vermont on January 5, 1818. He attended the common schools and graduated from Illinois College in Jacksonville, Illinois in 1846. He taught school in Mobile, Alabama, graduated from the law department of Harvard University, was admitted to the bar, and began practicing law.

Career
In 1860, Lewis was a delegate to the Republican National Convention. He enlisted in the Union Army on August 1, 1861 and served as captain of Company G, First Missouri Volunteers. He was appointed by the military authorities as judge of the civil commission court at Memphis, Tennessee in 1863. He was discharged from the service on November 15, 1864. He was president of the commissioners of Shelby County, Tennessee from 1867 to 1869.

Lewis was elected as a Republican to the 43rd Congress, and he served from March 4, 1873 to March 3, 1875.  He was an unsuccessful candidate for re-election in 1874 to the 44th Congress. He resumed the practice of law in Memphis and moved to St. Louis, Missouri in 1878. He was appointed to the United States land office in Salt Lake City, Utah, and he resigned in 1879.

After Lewis moved to Whitman County, Territory of Washington, he engaged in agricultural pursuits and stock raising.

Death
Lewis died in Colfax, Washington, on July 15, 1893 (age 75 years, 191 days). He is interred at Colfax Cemetery.

References

External links
 
 

1818 births
1893 deaths
American judges
Harvard Law School alumni
Illinois College alumni
People from Memphis, Tennessee
People from Alburgh, Vermont
People from Colfax, Washington
Republican Party members of the United States House of Representatives from Tennessee
19th-century American politicians
19th-century American judges